Gary Shelton (born 21 March 1958) is an English former professional footballer who played as a midfielder.

Playing career
Shelton came through the ranks at Walsall to become a first-team player, catching the eye of neighbours Aston Villa. He made an £80,000 switch to Villa Park in January 1978 but was to struggle to establish himself at the club. He made no appearances in the 1980–81 championship success and enjoyed just one more league outing before a £50,000 switch to Sheffield Wednesday in March 1982.

Shelton spent five years at Hillsborough, helping the club win promotion to the top-flight in 1984 and reach the FA Cup semi-finals two years later. In July 1987 Shelton moved to Oxford United for £150,000, but he was unable to prevent their relegation out of Division One and League Cup semi-final loss to Luton Town.

Shelton was transferred again in August 1989, when he joined Third Division side Bristol City in a swap deal with future England manager Steve McClaren. His first season ended in promotion and Shelton was to enjoy a brief spell in joint caretaker charge of the club with Mark Aizlewood and Russell Osman in 1992.

Shelton started more than 40 league games in three of his five seasons at Ashton Gate but appeared just three times in 1993–94 when he spent time on loan with Rochdale. In July 1994 Shelton joined Division Two side Chester City, where he was to remain for six years. He was appointed assistant manager to Kevin Ratcliffe in 1995 but continued to play for the club as he approached his late 30s.
His final league appearance for the club was a month before his 40th birthday on 14 February 1998, in a goalless draw at Hartlepool United. He remained registered as a player but was not involved on the playing side again. Shelton left his role with Chester in June 2000  shortly after they were relegated out of The Football League and he took up a coaching role with West Bromwich Albion that he held for several years.

Gary's eldest son, Andy Shelton, played for Chester while Gary was on the coaching staff.
Gary's youngest son, Gary Shelton, also played for Bristol Rovers and Chester youth teams before having brief spells at both Altrincham Town and Vauxhall Motors.

Honours
Sheffield Wednesday
Football League Division Two runners-up: 1983–84.

Bristol City
Football League Division Three runners-up: 1989–90.

External links

Bristol City managerial details

References

1958 births
Living people
Footballers from Nottingham
English footballers
Association football midfielders
Walsall F.C. players
Aston Villa F.C. players
Notts County F.C. players
Sheffield Wednesday F.C. players
Oxford United F.C. players
Bristol City F.C. players
Rochdale A.F.C. players
Chester City F.C. players
English football managers
Bristol City F.C. managers
English Football League players
England under-21 international footballers
Chester City F.C. non-playing staff